St. Gregory's Abbey is a Roman Catholic monastery of the American-Cassinese Congregation of the Benedictine Confederation. The monastery, founded by monks of the French monastery of Sainte-Marie de la Pierre-qui-Vire in 1876, was originally located in present-day Konawa, Oklahoma and called Sacred Heart Abbey. At present the community numbers around twenty-one monks who celebrate the Eucharist and Liturgy of the Hours. They used to staff various parishes but no longer do so, and their school, St. Gregory's University, was closed and filed for bankruptcy in 2017. 

The abbey is located in Shawnee, Oklahoma.

History
Benedictine monks first arrived from France in 1873, settling in Louisiana. They relocated to what was then Indian Territory in October 1875 at the suggestion of the Archbishop of New Orleans, Napoléon-Joseph Perché. He recruited his compatriots to provide pastoral care to the Native Americans of the region who had recently become a part of his ecclesiastical province. In 1876 the monks founded Sacred Heart Abbey in what today is Konawa, Oklahoma, led by the Rev. Dom Isidore Robot, O.S.B., who had been appointed Prefect Apostolic of the Indian Territory of Oklahoma by the Holy See upon the recommendation of Perché.

The monastic community grew steadily until 1901, when a fire destroyed much of the abbey. At the invitation of the city, the monks built their new monastery in Shawnee. At that time, they also established St. Gregory's College and High School, which was known as St. Gregory's University until it closed in 2017. The main building, known as Benedictine Hall, still stands and was included in the bankruptcy sale. It has been listed in the National Register of Historic Places listings in Pottawatomie County, Oklahoma.

See also
Rev. Gregory Gerrer, OSB

References

External links
 Abbey Website

Benedictine monasteries in the United States
Buildings and structures in Pottawatomie County, Oklahoma
St. Gregory's University
Roman Catholic Archdiocese of Oklahoma City